The Mid-Michigan Destroyers were a franchise in the Premier Basketball League which began play in the 2009 season.  Based in Bay City, they trained at the JJKN Hoops Training Center (formerly the historic St. Joe's Gymnasium) but played at the Bay City Western high school gymnasium.

The Destroyers tried to form strong rivalries with their fellow PBL teams in Michigan, the Detroit Panthers and the Battle Creek Knights, however two thirds of the way through their inaugural season, there was a split among the members of the ownership group and the team suspended operations for at least 2009, if not permanently.  The league also said the remaining Mid-Michigan games on the schedule would be filled by the remaining teams in the league.

2009 Season Schedule

References

External links
Official Website

Former Premier Basketball League teams
Basketball teams in Michigan
Sports in Bay City, Michigan
Basketball teams established in 2009
Basketball teams disestablished in 2009
2009 establishments in Michigan
2009 disestablishments in Michigan